Troutbeck may refer to:

Places
Troutbeck, Manicaland, a village in Manicaland, Zimbabwe 
Troutbeck, Eden, a hamlet near Penrith, Cumbria, England  
Troutbeck, South Lakeland, a village near Windermere, Cumbria, England  
Troutbeck Bridge, a village near Troutbeck, South Lakeland

Other uses
Trout Beck, a Cumbrian 'beck' in whose valley lies Troutbeck, South Lakeland
Troutbeck Tongue, a mountain in Cumbria above Trout Beck
Troutbeck (horse), a Thoroughbred racehorse

People with the surname
 John Troutbeck (diplomat) (1894–1971), British diplomat 
John Troutbeck(1832-1899), Anglican priest  and translator